Radhamma Kuthuru is an Indian Telugu-language drama television series airing on Zee Telugu from 26 August 2019. It is also available on digital streaming platform ZEE5. It stars Deepthi Manne, Gokul Menon and Meghana Raami in lead roles.

Plot 
Radhamma gives birth of three daughters named Archana, Akshara and Aparna. Radhamma's husband Gopal, who desperately wanted a son, decides to marry Menaka. Akshara vows to become an IAS officer to avenge her mother. Akshara marries Aravind, who is the son of Bujjamma. Akshara faces many hurdles and finally becomes an IAS officer. Meanwhile, she separated from Aravind.

Cast

Main 
 Deepthi Manne as Akshara; Radhamma, Gopal's second daughter; Aravind' wife; Bujjamma's daughter in law; Chinni and Bujji's mother
 Baby Netra Reddy as Young Akshara
 Gokul Menon as Aravind; Bujjamma's son; Radhamma's son-in-law; Chinni and Bujji's father
 Meghana Raami as Radhamma; Archana, Akshara and Aparna's mother; Gopal's first wife.

Recurring 
Meghna Raami as Radhamma;  Archana, Akshara and Aparna's mother;
 Sowmyalatha  as Bujjamma; Aravind's mother; Akshara's mother in law
 Maheshwari Vaddi as Shruthi; Sarala's daughter; Aravind's sister in law
 Chatrapathi Sekhar as Gopala Krishna; Radhamma and Menaka's husband; Archana, Akshara and Aparna's father
 Baby Nandhitha as Bujji; Akshara and Aravind's daughter
 Baby Sriyanshi Nandana as Chinni; Akshara and Aravind's daughter
 Sandra Jayachandran as Purandhari; Bujjamma's daughter
 Bommireddy Venkat as Rajesh; Bujjamma's son
 Sri Lalitha as Archana; Radhamma's daughter;
 Anchor Bhargav as Raghavendra; Purandhari's husband; 
 Vijay Bhargav as Madhav; Archana's husband
 Shobha Rani as Sarala; Shruthi's mother
 Vanitha as Bebamma
 Anu Manasa as Menaka; Gopal's second wife
 Surya Kiran as Seshu; Akshara's ex-fiancé;
 Sri Lakshmi Reddy as Aparna
 Kiranmai Prajapath as Varsha
 Koti as Hari; polluted police officer
 Kasinadh as Bujjamma's husband
 Duggi Abhi as Aravind's friend Durga
 Hritesh Awasty as Ramrao

Cameo Appearance 

 Sree Vishnu as himself (appeared for Raja Raja Chora movie promotions)
 Renu Desai as Goddess Parvathi
 Prajwal PD as Lord Shiva
 Raasi as Durgamma
 Chandana Shetty as Varudhini

Adaptations

Soundtrack

Production

Filming 
Due to the COVID-19 outbreak in India, Radhamma Kuthuru and all other television series and film shootings are halted from 19 March 2020. Three months later, the shooting was permitted and commenced from June,2020. The series commenced telecasting new episodes from June 22, 2020.

Reception

References

External links 
 Radhamma Kuthuru on ZEE5

Zee Telugu original programming
Indian drama television series
Telugu-language television shows
2019 Indian television series debuts
Serial drama television series
Indian television soap operas